Dahod Lok Sabha constituency (formerly Dohad Lok Sabha constituency) is one of the Lok Sabha parliamentary constituencies in Gujarat state in western India. This constituency is reserved for Scheduled Tribes.

Assembly segments
Presently, Dahod Lok Sabha constituency comprises seven assembly segments. These are:

Members of Parliament 

^ by poll

Election Results

General Election 2019

General Election 2014

General Elections 2009

General Election, 2004

See also
 Dahod district
 List of Constituencies of the Lok Sabha

Notes

Lok Sabha constituencies in Gujarat
Dahod district